Emerita talpoida, known generally as the Atlantic mole crab or Atlantic sand crab, is a species of mole crab in the family Hippidae. It is found in the western Atlantic Ocean and Mexico along the shoreline.

Range
The Atlantic mole crab inhabits the swash zone of sandy beaches from Cape Cod south to the gulf Coast of Mexico. It is one of six New World Emerita species.

Ecology
Like all of the nine Emerita species, the Atlantic mole crab is a fossorial filter feeder. It requires moving water in order to feed, and it does so by burrowing itself backwards into the sand. It uses its exposed feathery antennae to filter algae, detritus, and plankton.

The Atlantic mole crab is an important food source for the Atlantic ghost crab, the blue crab, and certain species of fish in the swash zone. Shorebirds, notably sanderlings have also been observed foraging for sand crabs. The combination of the its burrowing feeding strategy and its camouflaged carapace assist the Atlantic mole crab in evading predation.

Because they spend much of their life in the swash zone, they can serve as a bioindicator for the effects of large-scale engineering works.

Taxonomy 
Emerita talpoida was oiginally recorded as Hippa talpoida in 1817. In 1879 a review of the family reassigned multiple species, including talpoida, from the genus Hippa to the genus Emerita. The two are now considered sister genera.

References

Further reading

External links

 

Hippoidea
Articles created by Qbugbot
Crustaceans described in 1817